Parmenops longicornis is an extinct species of beetle in the family Cerambycidae, and the only species in the genus Parmenops. It was described by Schaufuss in 1891. It has been found in Baltic amber.

References

Lamiinae
Beetles described in 1891